William Arthur Stein (born February 21, 1974 in Santa Barbara, California) is a software developer and previously a professor of mathematics at the University of Washington.

He is the lead developer of SageMath and founder of CoCalc. Stein does computational and theoretical research into the problem of computing with modular forms and the Birch and Swinnerton-Dyer conjecture. He is considered "a leading expert in the field of computational arithmetic".

References

External links 
 
 

1974 births
20th-century American mathematicians
21st-century American mathematicians
Computer programmers
Free software programmers
Living people
Northern Arizona University alumni
Number theorists
University of California, Berkeley alumni
University of Washington faculty